Cassandra De Pecol (born June 23, 1989) is an American author, traveler, activist, and speaker. In 2017, she had set Guinness World Records in two categories: "Fastest time to visit all sovereign countries" and "Fastest time to visit all sovereign countries - Female". Both records have since been broken. She also appears on the reality television series Naked and Afraid.

World travels
From July 24, 2015 to February 2, 2017, De Pecol traveled to every sovereign nation in the world. In 2017, De Pecol had two Guinness World Records: "Fastest time to visit all sovereign countries" and "Fastest time to visit all sovereign countries - Female". Both records have since been beat by Taylor Demonbreun. 

While traveling, she spoke to over 16,000 university students in 40 countries, and acted as a 'peace ambassador' for the International Institute of Peace Through Tourism. Though she planted trees to help offset her carbon footprint, she was criticized for taking a large number of flights, as well as for spending only a little time in each country. The trip around the world cost about US$111,000 and was funded by sponsors that De Pecol obtained throughout the Expedition. De Pecol filmed her travels in order to create a documentary.

Lawsuit
DePecol has been sued by Travelers United, which states that she has made “unfair and deceptive” claims related to advertising. Washington Post reporter Taylor Lorenz wrote that Travelers United "hopes that the lawsuit will be a watershed moment in the industry, bringing more accountability to claims made by travel content creators. "We hope that other nonprofits will be emboldened to bring similar lawsuits," said Lauren Wolfe, counsel for Travelers United." Travelers United said that De Pecol had incorrectly said she was the "first woman to travel to every country" and that she had said she would be the "first sponsored astronaut" by Virgin Galactic. Virgin Galactic would not confirm they had any relationship with De Pecol.

Other appearances
On December 8, 2013, DePecol appeared on the show Naked and Afraid in a special called "Double Jeopardy". She received the lowest score of any contestant in the first season who completed the 21 day challenge.

See also
Dorothy Pine, an American woman who was likely the first woman in the world to travel to every country

References

1989 births
Living people
Female travelers
Participants in American reality television series
People from Connecticut
20th-century American women
21st-century American women
Guinness World Records
20th-century American people